The Rugby Europe Under-20 Championship is an annual rugby union championship for Under-20 national teams. It replaced the Under-19 championship that was held since 2007. The championship is organised by rugby's European governing body, the Rugby Europe.

The tournament serves as Europe's qualification to the next year's World Rugby Under 20 Trophy organised by the World Rugby.

Georgia were the champions of 2014 which was held in Lisbon, Portugal.

On March 12, 2020, following the recent evolution of COVID-19, Rugby Europe has announced a suspension of all its matches and tournaments, from Friday, March 13, 2020 until April 15, 2020. On March 26 Rugby Europe has decided to extend the suspension of all its matches and tournaments for an indefinite period of time. On April 8 Rugby Europe Board of Directors decided to cancel 2020 European Under-20 Rugby Union Championship.

Results

European Under-19 Rugby Union Championship

Rugby Europe Under-20 Championship

See also 
 European Under-18 Rugby Union Championship

References

External links
 Rugby Europe official website

Under-20
European youth sports competitions
Europe